The 1904 Summer Olympics, officially the Games of the III Olympiad, were an international multi-sport event which was held in 1904 in St. Louis, Missouri, United States.

{| id="toc" class="toc" summary="Contents"
|align="center" colspan=4|Contents
|-
|
Archery
Athletics
Boxing
Cycling
Diving
|valign=top|
Fencing
Football
Golf
Gymnastics
Lacrosse
|valign=top|
Roque
Rowing
Swimming
Tennis
Tug of war
|valign=top|
Water polo
Weightlifting
Wrestling
|-
|align=center colspan=4|See also   References
|}


Archery

Athletics

Boxing

1Jack Egan originally won the silver medal in the lightweight competition and the bronze medal in the welterweight competition, but he was disqualified in November 1905 when it was discovered that his real name was Frank Joseph Floyd; AAU rules made it illegal to fight under an assumed name.

Cycling

Diving

Fencing

Football

Golf

Gymnastics

Lacrosse

Roque

Rowing

Swimming

Tennis

Tug of war

Water polo

Weightlifting

Wrestling

See also
 1904 Summer Olympics medal table

References

External links

1904 Summer Olympics
Lists of Summer Olympic medalists by year